The women's 400 metres hurdles event at the 2009 Summer Universiade was held on 7–9 July.

Medalists

Results

Heats
Qualification: First 2 of each heat (Q) and the next 2 fastest (q) qualified for the final.

Final

References
Results (archived)

400
2009 in women's athletics
2009